Zhaodun is a town under the administration of Pizhou, Jiangsu, China. , it administers Yanpu Residential Neighborhood and the following 27 villages:
Zhaodun Village
Guokou Village
Penghu Village
Qianliu Village
Zhongliu Village
Maohu Village
Guohe Village
Xingtang Village
Gengting Village
Tianmiao Village
Zhangzhuang Village
Chenghe Village
Henglou Village
Tandong Village
Tanxi Village
Xipaifang Village
Guzhuang Village
Hujia Village
Hewan Village
Niqiao Village
Yihe Village
Zhaihe Village
Guzi Village
Liuyuan Village
Shaji Village
Liutai Village
Gengbu Village

References 

Township-level divisions of Jiangsu
Pizhou